The 2003 Mutua Madrileña Masters Madrid was a tennis tournament played on indoor hard courts. It was the 2nd edition of the Madrid Masters and was part of the Tennis Masters Series of the 2003 ATP Tour. It took place at the Madrid Arena in Madrid in Spain from 13 October through 19 October 2003. First-seeded Juan Carlos Ferrero

Finals

Singles

 Juan Carlos Ferrero defeated  Nicolás Massú 6–3, 6–4, 6–3
 It was Ferrero's 4th title of the year and the 11th of his career. It was his 2nd Masters Series title of the year and his 4th overall.

Doubles

 Mahesh Bhupathi /  Max Mirnyi defeated  Wayne Black /  Kevin Ullyett 6–2, 2–6, 6–3
 It was Bhupathi's 5th title of the year and the 31st of his career. It was Mirnyi's 7th title of the year and the 20th of his career.

External links
 Official website
 ATP Tournament Profile

 

 
2003 ATP Tour
2003 in Spanish tennis